Samuel S. Jones (September 3, 1854 – November 26, 1912) was an American farmer, teacher, and politician.

Biography
Jones was born on September 3, 1854, in Clinton (town), Rock County, Wisconsin. He owned a farm in his native town and in the nearby Clinton (village), Rock County, Wisconsin. He went to the Clinton public schools and to the Allen's Grove Academy. Jones also went to Milton College. He taught school from 1873 to 1880. He also served as county highway commissioner for Rock County, Wisconsin. Jones died on November 26, 1912, at his home in the town of Clinton.

His former home, now known as the Samuel S. Jones Cobblestone House, is listed on the National Register of Historic Places.

Political career
Jones was a member of the Wisconsin State Assembly in 1895 and 1896. Additionally, he was town clerk and chairman (similar to mayor) of the town board (similar to city council) of Clinton and chairman of the county board of Rock County, Wisconsin. Jones also served on the school board and was the clerk of the school board. He was a Republican.

References

External links

People from Clinton, Rock County, Wisconsin
Milton College alumni
Republican Party members of the Wisconsin State Assembly
Mayors of places in Wisconsin
Wisconsin city council members
City and town clerks
School board members in Wisconsin
County supervisors in Wisconsin
Educators from Wisconsin
Farmers from Wisconsin
1854 births
1912 deaths
Burials in Wisconsin